Gibberula hardingae is a species of sea snail, a marine gastropod mollusk, in the family Cystiscidae.

Distribution
This species occurs in New Zealand Exclusive Economic Zone.

References

hardingae
Gastropods described in 1956
Cystiscidae